Karapadites is an extinct ammonoid genus belonging to the desmoceratacean family Kossmaticeratidae and considered by some to be a subgenus of Kossmaticeras.

Karapadites (=K(Karapadites)) which lived during the Late Cretaceous in the late Campanian has a strongly ribbed evolute shell, all whorls exposed, ribs crossing the rounded outer rim, or venter.

References

 Arkell, et al. 1957. Mesozoic Ammonoidea, L374; Treatise on Invertebrate Paleontology Part L (Ammonoidea); Geol Soc of America and Univ Kansas Press.

Late Cretaceous ammonites
Fossils of Antarctica
Santonian genus first appearances
Campanian genus extinctions
Desmoceratoidea
Ammonite genera